Shun'ichi or Shunichi (written:  or ) is a masculine Japanese given name. Notable people with the name include:

, Japanese baseball player and manager
, Japanese academic
, Japanese footballer
, Japanese sprint canoeist
, Japanese engineer
, Japanese film director
, Japanese diplomat
, Japanese volleyball player, announcer and television personality
, Japanese footballer
Shun'ichi Kuryu (born 1958), Japanese bureaucrat
, Japanese diplomat
, Japanese musician and voice actor
, Japanese politician
, Japanese film director and screenwriter
, Japanese footballer
, Japanese baseball player
, Japanese mixed martial artist
, Japanese politician
, Japanese footballer
, Japanese composer
, Japanese mixed martial artist, kickboxer and sumo wrestler
, Japanese politician
, Japanese physician
, Japanese screenwriter

Japanese masculine given names